Manmunai South West Divisional Secretariat is a  Divisional Secretariat  of Batticaloa District, of Eastern Province, Sri Lanka.

References
 Divisional Secretariats Portal

External links
 DS Manmunai South West Divisional Secretariat - Overview

Divisional Secretariats of Batticaloa District